Mark Allen Bourlakas is the sixth and current bishop of the Episcopal Diocese of Southwestern Virginia.

Biography 
After studies at Sewanee: The University of the South and Seabury-Western Theological Seminary, he was ordained to the diaconate on May 24, 1997, and to the priesthood on December 6, 1997. After ordination, he served parishes in North Carolina, South Carolina, and Tennessee.  On November 20, 2006, the cathedral chapter elected him Dean of Christ Church Cathedral in Louisville, Kentucky. he was installed in 2007. Bourlakas was elected Bishop of Southwestern Virginia on March 9, 2013, and was consecrated on July 20, 2013, at the Roanoke Performing Arts Theatre.

See also
 List of Episcopal bishops of the United States
 Historical list of the Episcopal bishops of the United States

References

Living people
Sewanee: The University of the South alumni
Year of birth missing (living people)
Episcopal bishops of Southwestern Virginia